The flash pan or priming pan is a small receptacle for priming powder, found next to the touch hole on muzzle-loading guns. Flash pans are found on gonnes, matchlocks, wheellocks, snaplocks, snaphances, and flintlocks.

Development 
The flash pan was at first attached to the gun barrel, but was later moved to the lock plate of the gun. A small amount of finely ground gunpowder is placed in the flash pan and ignited. The flash of flame travels through the touch hole igniting the main charge of propellant inside the barrel. Unlike the cannon, it was not necessary (or desirable) to place priming in the touch hole itself. The flash alone, and not particles of burning powder, was enough to ignite the main charge.

"Flash in the pan" 
The ignition of the main charge from the flash pan was not a guaranteed operation, however, and sometimes it failed. In those cases the spark would flash in the pan, but the gun would fail to fire. This led by the end of the 17th century to the expression "flash in the pan" to mean a failure after a brief and showy start, or momentary sensation of no real importance.

See also 
Miquelet lock
Glossary of firearms terminology

Notes

External links 
 Handgonnes and Matchlocks 

Firearm components